A partial solar eclipse will occur on June 1, 2087. A solar eclipse occurs when the Moon passes between Earth and the Sun, thereby totally or partly obscuring the image of the Sun for a viewer on Earth. A partial solar eclipse occurs in the polar regions of the Earth when the center of the Moon's shadow misses the Earth.

Related eclipses

Solar eclipses 2083–2087

Metonic series

References

External links 

2087 6 1
2087 6 1
2087 6 1
2087 in science